Black Rock Shooter is the name of both a 2010 original video animation (OVA) and a 2012 anime television series, based on the character created by illustrator Huke. Produced by Ordet, the series, which both feature their own story lines, focus on two worlds, the human world involving the life of a girl named Mato Kuroi and her friendship with Yomi Takanashi, and the other world, where a mysterious girl known as Black Rock Shooter fights fierce battles.

The OVA is directed and written by Shinobu Yoshioka, with Nagaru Tanigawa co-writing, Yūsuke Matsuo designing the characters based on Huke's original concepts and ryo composing the music, and was first announced in August 2009, with a pilot edition released on DVD and Blu-ray Disc (BD) on September 30, 2009. The full 50-minute OVA was bundled with various magazines from July 24, 2010, before receiving a retail release on DVD and BD on December 17, 2010. The ending theme for the OVA is "Braveheart" by The Gomband. 

The anime television series aired on Fuji TV's Noitamina block between February 2 and March 22, 2012. It is directed by Shinobu Yoshioka, with Hiroyuki Imaishi directing the CG sequences, Mari Okada writing the scripts, Yūsuke Yoshigaki designing the characters based on Huke's original concepts and Hideharu Mori composing the music. The series was released on DVD and BD on June 22, 2012 in a box set containing the original soundtrack and an Insane Black Rock Shooter Figma figurine.

On September 16, 2021, a new anime television series titled Black Rock Shooter: Dawn Fall was announced. It is produced by Bibury Animation Studios and Bibury Animation CG and directed by Tensho, with scripts written by Makoto Fukami in cooperation with Ryō Yoshigami. Character designs are provided by Masayuki Nonaka and Yō Nakagawa, both of whom also serving as chief animation directors. It aired from April 3 to June 19, 2022, on Tokyo MX and other networks. The opening theme is "Aseed" by Zaq, while the ending theme is "Before the Nightmare" by Kanako Takatsuki. Disney licensed the anime as one of its first in a move to release more Asian-produced content on its streaming platform Disney+.

Series overview

Episode list

Black Rock Shooter (2010)

Black Rock Shooter (2012)

Black Rock Shooter: Dawn Fall (2022)

Notes

References

Black Rock Shooter